Jackson Township may refer to one of the following places in the U.S. state of Illinois:

 Jackson Township, Effingham County, Illinois
 Jackson Township, Will County, Illinois

See also 
 Jackson Township (disambiguation)

Illinois township disambiguation pages